Budgie were a Welsh heavy metal band from Cardiff. Formed in late 1967, the group originally consisted of lead vocalist and bassist Burke Shelley, guitarists and backing vocalists Tony Bourge and Brian Goddard, and drummer Ray Phillips. The group broke up in 2010, when their lineup featured Shelley, drummer Steve Williams (originally a member from 1974 to 1986, and later since 1999), and guitarist Craig Goldy (who joined in 2008).

History

1967–1988
Budgie were formed in late 1967. The original lineup featured Burke Shelley, Brian Goddard, Tony Bourge and Ray Phillips. By early 1970, Goddard had left the group because, according to Shelley, "he got a girl pregnant and suddenly had to get a job". The remaining trio released Budgie in 1971, Squawk in 1972 and Never Turn Your Back on a Friend in 1973. By the end of 1973, Phillips had left Budgie. He was replaced by Pete Boot, who debuted on In for the Kill! released the following year. After around a year with the band, Boot was replaced at the end of 1974 by Steve Williams. Bandolier, If I Were Brittania I'd Waive the Rules and Impeckable followed, before Bourge left in the summer of 1978. He later recalled that "I would've loved to have carried on, but after a while the lifestyle gets to you."

Bourge was replaced by former Trapeze guitarist Rob Kendrick, while former Hawkwind guitarist Huw Lloyd-Langton also joined briefly. By the end of the summer, the latter had left and the group reverted to a trio. After briefly relocating to Texas, the band fired Kendrick and replaced him with "Big" John Thomas at the end of 1979. This lineup remained constant throughout the rest of the 1980s, releasing the EP If Swallowed, Do Not Induce Vomiting in 1980, followed by three studio albums: Power Supply (1980), Nightflight (1981) and Deliver Us from Evil (1982). After a few more years touring, Budgie were dropped by RCA Records and Williams left in mid-1986, replaced by Jim Simpson of UFO. Two more years of touring followed, before the group disbanded following a final show in May 1988.

1995–2022
In early 1995, Burke Shelley and John Thomas reformed Budgie with drummer Robert "Congo" Jones (formerly of Love Sculpture) for a select number of American shows. The group reformed again in mid-1999, with Steve Williams returning on drums. In February 2002, Thomas was forced to leave the band after suffering a stroke which rendered him unable to perform effectively. He was replaced by Andy Hart, who debuted on Life in San Antonio recorded in the summer. The following March, Hart was forced to leave for "personal reasons". He was replaced by Simon Lees.

Lees performed on 2006's You're All Living in Cuckooland, Budgie's first studio album since 1982. He later left in July 2007, with Andy James taking his place in October. By January 2008, James had been replaced by Dio guitarist Craig Goldy on a part-time "special guest" basis. In November 2010, Budgie were forced to cancel a European tour after Shelley suffered an aortic aneurysm for which he underwent surgery. The band have not performed since, with Shelley announcing in 2020 that his condition had worsened, and that he planned to release a final album of unreleased Budgie tracks. Shelley died on January 10, 2022, aged 71, in his hometown of Cardiff.

Members

Final

Former

Backup

Timeline

Lineups
Names in bold text indicate newly joined members.

References

External links
Budgie official website

Budgie